Apstar 6C is a Chinese communications satellite which is operated by APT Satellite Holdings as part of the Apstar system.

References 

Communications satellites in geostationary orbit
Communications satellites of China
Spacecraft launched in 2018
2018 in China
Satellites using the DFH-4 bus
Spacecraft launched by Long March rockets